Chicago law may refer to:
Chicago-Kent College of Law
Loyola University Chicago School of Law
Northwestern University School of Law
University of Chicago Law School